Gupa-Abawa is a Nupoid language spoken in Niger State, Nigeria. It is named after its two ethnicities, Gupa and Abawa.

Gupa is spoken in the villages of Gupa, Abugi-Jankara, Emirokpa, Favu, Kenigi, Kpotagi, Abete, Kuba, Avu, Dagbaje, Eji, Jihun, Yelwa, Cheku, Atsu,chepa, Alaba, Gbedu, and Kirikpo located to the south of Lapai. Lexically, it is most closely related to Kami and Dibo.

References

Nupoid languages
Languages of Nigeria